Nebria scaphelytra is a species of ground beetle in the Nebriinae subfamily that is endemic to North Korea.

References

scaphelytra
Beetles described in 1996
Beetles of Asia
Endemic fauna of North Korea